Joel Sherman is a sportswriter for the New York Post. He is also a baseball insider with MLB Network and co-hosts with Jon Heyman the baseball podcast The Show.

He was born and raised in Canarsie in Brooklyn, New York.
He graduated from NYU in 1985.

Sherman worked for both the in-house Washington Square News and the UPI while at NYU.

Sherman joined the New York Post in 1989, and served as a beat writer writing about the New York Yankees from 1989 to 1995. In 2013, Sherman joined MLB Network as an insider. Sherman has been a voter for the National Baseball Hall of Fame since 1998.

References

External links
MLB Network bio
NY Post archive

 

Living people
New York Post people
MLB Network personalities
People from Canarsie, Brooklyn
Sportswriters from New York (state)
Journalists from New York City
20th-century American journalists
American male journalists
21st-century American journalists
20th-century American male writers
21st-century American male writers
American male non-fiction writers
Year of birth missing (living people)